Cameron Burrell (September 11, 1994August 9, 2021) was an American sprinter. He was the NCAA Division I champion over 100 meters in 2018, and anchored the Houston Cougars to victory in the  meters relay in 2017 and 2018. He ran for the United States  relay team at the World Junior Championships in 2012 and the World Relays in 2019, with the team earning gold and silver from each competition respectively. Additionally Burrell anchored the U.S.  relay team to gold at the inaugural Athletics World Cup in 2018.

He was the son of Olympic gold medalist and former 100 meters world record holder Leroy Burrell and Olympic gold medalist Michelle Finn-Burrell. He was also the godson of former track and field star Carl Lewis. On June 8, 2017 he became the 121st man to break the 10-second barrier over 100 meters in a time of 9.93 seconds, beating his father's school record set five years before Cameron's birth by one hundredth of a second. He repeated this feat a year later at the USA Championships.

Early life
Burrell was born on September 11, 1994 to former 100m world record holder Leroy Burrell and Olympic gold medalist Michelle Finn-Burrell. He has two siblings, Joshua and Jaden. Growing up, Cameron Burrell was surrounded by athletics; in addition to his parents' athletic background, his aunt Dawn Burrell was the 2001 World Indoor Champion in the Long Jump. His father's teammate and close friend was Carl Lewis, who knew Cameron his whole life. Despite this, his family never forced him into athletics, though Cameron already knew he wanted to be a sprinter at a very young age.

Cameron attended Ridge Point High School in Missouri City, Texas. Throughout his junior years, he competed at the 2011 World Youth Championships in Lille, the 2012 World Junior Championships in Barcelona, and the 2013 Pan American Junior Championships in Medellín. He also formed a close friendship with his rival from Morton Ranch High School, Elijah Hall. After graduating from Ridge Point in June 2013, Burrell chose to follow in his father's footsteps and attend the University of Houston, where his father was coaching.

Collegiate career

20142015
During his freshman year, Burrell made the NCAA Indoor 60m final, where he finished 6th. Outdoors, he ran a leg on the 4x100m relay at the NCAA Outdoor Championships but finished 7th in the heats and did not qualify for the final. He started out strong in his sophomore season, but suffered an injury and was forced to miss the Indoor Championships and Redshirt his outdoor season.

2016
Burrell returned to competition in 2016, and finished 2nd in the NCAA 60m final, setting a school record at 6.48. Outdoors, he won his first conference title in the 100m and finished 4th at the NCAA Championships in 10.26.

2017
Burrell once again finished 2nd at the NCAA 60m final, this time to Christian Coleman of Tennessee, who equaled the collegiate record of 6.45. During the outdoor season, he broke his father's long-standing school record in the 100m with 9.93 during the semifinals of the NCAA Championships. In the final, he finished second to Coleman again. During the 4x100m however, he anchored Houston to the victory in 38.34.

2018
Having already completed four indoor seasons, Burrell was able to compete only outdoors. At the NCAA Championships, he anchored the Cougars to a collegiate record in the 4x100m, defending their title from the previous year. Then, with two other Cougars in the 100m final, he finally won his first NCAA individual title, with Elijah Hall 2nd and Mario Burke 8th. Burrell dedicated his win to his teammate Brian Barraza, who fell after leading in the steeplechase and finished in 10th.

Burrell equaled his personal best of 9.93 in the heats of the US Championships, then went on to finish 5th in the final. He competed at the inaugural Athletics World Cup in London, England, anchoring the US' 4x100m team to victory in 38.42 seconds. He stayed in London for his Diamond League debut at the Anniversary Games, where he placed 4th in his heat and 9th in the final. Burrell then traveled to Toronto for the NACAC Championships, and picked up a bronze medal in the 100m.

After their seasons ended, Burrell and Elijah Hall turned professional and signed with Nike and Red Bull.

Death
Burrell died on August 9, 2021, at the age of 26. It was later revealed he died by suicide from a gunshot in a parking garage in Houston, Texas.

Statistics
Information from World Athletics profile unless otherwise noted.

Personal bests

International championship results

National championship results

NCAA results from Track & Field Results Reporting System.

Seasonal bests

Notes

References

External links

 (Track & Field Results Reporting System)
Cameron Burrell bio at Houston Cougars

1994 births
2021 deaths
2021 suicides
African-American male track and field athletes
American male sprinters
Track and field athletes from Houston
Houston Cougars men's track and field athletes
United States collegiate record holders in athletics (track and field)
Universiade silver medalists for the United States
Universiade bronze medalists for the United States
Universiade medalists in athletics (track and field)
Medalists at the 2017 Summer Universiade
Suicides by firearm in Texas
21st-century African-American sportspeople